Cole Seely (born March 10, 1990) is an American professional motocross racer.

Seely finished fourth overall in the 250cc Western Region Supercross and 14th in the 250cc  AMA Motocross Championship in 2011 riding for HRC Honda.

He was the 2014 250SX Class Western Regional championship runner-up.

Seely began his 450cc rookie season in 2015 riding for the factory Honda team. He was named Monster Energy Supercross Rookie of the Year in 2015.

In 2017 Seely finished seventh in Supercross and fifth in Motocross, earning him a position on the Motocross des Nations US team.

References

Living people
1990 births
People from Westlake Village, California
People from Newbury Park, California
American motocross riders